Elena Daniela Cârlan (or Cîrlan born 18 September 1980, in Sibiu) is a female long-distance runner and former race walker from Romania.

Race walker
As a race walker her biggest successes were a fifth place in 5000 m walk at the 1998 World Junior Championships and a sixteenth place in 20 km at the 2004 World Race Walking Cup. She also competed at the 2003 World Championships and the 2004 Olympic Games.

Long-distance running
In 2006 Cârlan took up running. In October 2007 she ran the half marathon in 1:12:14 hours, finishing 28th at the 2007 IAAF World Road Running Championships.

Achievements

External links 
 
  (2004)
  (2016)
 
 

1980 births
Living people
Romanian female racewalkers
Athletes (track and field) at the 2004 Summer Olympics
Athletes (track and field) at the 2016 Summer Olympics
Olympic athletes of Romania
Romanian female long-distance runners
Sportspeople from Sibiu